Chris Edwards (born 1973 in Roseburg, Oregon) is an American politician, and University Administrator from Oregon; he is a member of the Democratic party.

Edwards currently works in an administrative role at the University of Oregon overseeing the creation of the new Phil and Penny Knight Campus for Accelerating Scientific Impact, he came to this job having served in the Oregon State Senate, representing District 7, for six years. Previously, Edwards served in the Oregon House of Representatives, representing District 14 from 2006 until his appointment to the Senate.

References

External links
Oregon State House - Chris Edwards official government website
Project Vote Smart - Representative Chris Edwards (OR) profile
Follow the Money - Chris Edwards
2006 campaign contributions

1973 births
Living people
Members of the Oregon House of Representatives
Oregon state senators
21st-century American politicians